"Good Time" is a song recorded by Australian pop group Justice Crew. The single was released on 13 November 2015. Upon its release, "Good Time" debuted at number 79 on the ARIA Singles Chart.

The group said; "Our single "Good time" is all about the title itself. As a group when we first heard the demo we thought it fitted us well. As majority of us come from a break dancing background it has that kind of funk to it and that's what we loved about it." The group added; "The song itself came from Jason Derulo's team. Anything that comes from him is always good. Recording it was a long process, as each time we heard a cut we kept on wanting to add on and make it more of a Justice Crew sound."

Justice Crew performed the song on The X Factor Australia on 17 November.

Music video and promotion
The accompanying music video was released on 17 November 2015. and centres around the boys inside a studio set-up, with a car and a fancy retro vinyl player for company.

Track listing
Digital download
 "Good Time" – 3:14

CD single
 "Good Time" – 3:14
 "Good Time" (instrumental) – 3:14

Charts

Release history

References

2015 songs
2015 singles
Justice Crew songs
Sony Music Australia singles